Tatiana Hurtado Lerma is a Colombian freestyle wrestler. She won the silver medal in the women's 57kg event at the 2022 Bolivarian Games held in Valledupar, Colombia. She won one of the bronze medals in her event at the 2022 South American Games held in Asunción, Paraguay.

In 2021, she won the silver medal in the women's 57kg event at the Junior Pan American Games held in Cali, Colombia.

She competed in the women's 55kg event at the 2022 U23 World Wrestling Championships held in Pontevedra, Spain.

Achievements

References

External links 
 

Living people
Year of birth missing (living people)
Place of birth missing (living people)
Colombian female sport wrestlers
South American Games bronze medalists for Colombia
South American Games medalists in wrestling
Competitors at the 2022 South American Games
21st-century Colombian women